Ambegaon may refer to one of the following places in India:

Ambegaon, a town in Pune district, Maharashtra
Ambegaon tehsil, a tehsil in Pune district
Ambegaon (village), a village in Pune district
Ambegaon (Vidhan Sabha constituency)